Boylston  is a rural community in the Canadian province of Nova Scotia, in the Municipality of the District of Guysborough in Guysborough County.  There is a provincial park camp-ground in Boylston.

Some researchers have asserted that Boylston was visited by Henry Sinclair based on evidence  in the Zeno Narrative.

References

Communities in Guysborough County, Nova Scotia